Thornton Township is one of 29 townships in Cook County, Illinois.  As of the 2020 census, its population was 157,865.

Incorporated in 1850, it is located immediately south of the city of Chicago. It is the second most populous township in Illinois as of the 2020 census, after Rockford Township (pop. 170,478) in Winnebago County.

The village of South Holland serves as the governmental seat of Thornton Township. The township is named after the village of Thornton, located in the south central portion of the township. Many parts of the township carry names inspired by the village's name, including the three high schools of Thornton Township District 205: Thornton Township High School in Harvey; Thornwood High School in South Holland; Thornridge High School in Dolton; Thornton Fractional South High School in Lansing; Thornton Fractional North High School in Calumet City and Thornton Fractional Center for Academics and Technology also in Calumet City. Supervisor Frank M. Zuccarelli was voted Supervisor of the Year in 2007 by the Township Officials of Illinois for his outstanding service to the residents of Thornton Township.

Geography

Boundaries
Thornton Township is bordered by Western Avenue on the west, 138th Street on the north, the Indiana state line on the east, and 183rd/186th Street on the south.

Cities and villages

Unincorporated Towns
 Berger at 
 Bernice at 
 Globe at 
 Greenwood at 
 North Harvey at 
 Oakglen at 
 Schrum at 
 South Harvey at 
 Thornton Junction at 
 West Harvey at

Adjacent townships

Cemeteries
The township contains these 11 cemeteries: Berger, First Reformed of Lansing, Glen Oak, Hazelwood, Holy Cross Catholic, Homewood Memorial Gardens, Mount Forest, Oak Lawn, Oak Ridge, Oakland and Washington Memory Gardens.

Major highways

Airports and landing strips
 Ingalls Memorial Hospital Heliport

Lakes

Forest Preserves
The following are all part of the Cook County Forest Preserves:

Colleges
 South Suburban College

Demographics

According to the 2020 Census, there were 157,865 people, 61,490 households, and 37,187 families in the township. The population declined by 11,461 people or by 6.77% between the 2010 and 2020 censuses. Out of the 66,938 housing units, 7,065 of them were vacant.  

The racial makeup of the township was 69.94% Black, 14.11% White, 0.51% Native American, 0.59% Asian, 8.67% from other races, and 6.14% from two or more races. Latinos of any race made up 15.19% of the population.

Of the inhabitants, 22.4% were under the age of 18, 63.4% were between 18 and 65 years old, and 14.2% were aged 65 years or older. The median age was 38.7 years. For every 100 females, there were 77.9 males.

Political districts

References
 
 United States Census Bureau 2007 TIGER/Line Shapefiles
 United States National Atlas

External links
 Thornton Township official website
 Township Officials of Illinois
 Cook County official site
 City-Data.com
 Illinois State Archives
 

Townships in Cook County, Illinois
Townships in Illinois
1850 establishments in Illinois